Bromophenol blue (3′,3″,5′,5″-tetrabromophenolsulfonphthalein, BPB), albutest is used as a pH indicator,  an electrophoretic color marker, and a dye.  It can be prepared by slowly adding excess bromine to a hot solution of phenolsulfonphthalein in glacial acetic acid.

Acid–base indicator

As an acid–base indicator, its useful range lies between pH 3.0 and 4.6. It changes from yellow at pH 3.0 to blue at pH 4.6; this reaction is reversible. Bromophenol blue is structurally related to phenolphthalein (a popular indicator).

Color marker
Bromophenol is also used as a colour marker to monitor the process of agarose gel electrophoresis and polyacrylamide gel electrophoresis.  Since bromophenol blue carries a slight negative charge at moderate pH, it will migrate in the same direction as DNA or protein in a gel; the rate at which it migrates varies according to gel density and buffer composition, but in a typical 1% agarose gel in a 1X TAE buffer or TBE buffer, bromophenol blue migrates at the same rate as a DNA fragment of about 300 base pairs, in 2% agarose as 150 bp. Xylene cyanol and orange G may also be used for this purpose.

Dye
Bromophenol blue is also used as a dye. At neutral pH, the dye absorbs red light most strongly and transmits blue light. (Its peak absorbance is 600 nm at a basic pH of 12.)  Solutions of the dye, therefore, are blue.  At low pH, the dye absorbs ultraviolet and blue light most strongly and appears yellow in solution. 
In solution at pH 3.6 (in the middle of the transition range of this pH indicator) obtained by dissolution in water without any pH adjustment, bromophenol blue has a characteristic green red colour, where the apparent colour shifts depending on the concentration and/or path length through which the solution is observed. This phenomenon is called dichromatic color. Bromophenol blue is the substance with the highest known value of Kreft's dichromaticity index. This means it has the largest change in colour hue, when the thickness or concentration of observed sample increases or decreases.

See also
 Bromophenol

References

External links
 Bromophenol blue at OpenWetWare

PH indicators
Triarylmethane dyes
Phenol dyes
Bromoarenes
Benzoxathioles